FK Hvězda Cheb is a Czech football club, playing in the town of Cheb. The club was founded in 1951 and refounded in 2001 after a bankruptcy in 1996. The club played for 13 consecutive seasons in the Czechoslovak First League between 1979 and 1992, and played three seasons in the Czech First League, finishing fourth in the 1993–94 season. The club played in the third-tier Bohemian Football League between 2006 and 2008. It currently plays in the Czech Fourth Division.

The club also had appearances in Europe playing the Mitropa Cup in 1980 and in Intertoto Cup 1981, in which it won its group.

The club announced a change in its name from Union Cheb to Hvězda Cheb in 2011.

Club's name
 1951 : VSJ Sokolovo Cheb
 1952 : DSO Rudá Hvězda Cheb
 1966 : VTJ Dukla Hraničář Cheb
 1972 : TJ Rudá Hvězda Cheb (RH Cheb)
 1990 : SKP Union Cheb
 1994 : FC Union Cheb
 1996 : defunct
 2001 : founded a phoenix club
 2011 : FK Hvězda Cheb

Famous players
Czechoslovak and Czech international players
Jozef Chovanec, 1979–1981, 52 caps, 4 goals
Vladimír Hruška, 1979–1981, 3 caps, 1 goal
Zdeněk Koubek, 1979–1983, 5 caps
Pavel Kuka, 1987–1989, 89 caps
Radim Nečas, 1995–2000, 4 caps
Lubomír Pokluda 1979 – 1984, 4 caps, 1980 olympic gold medalist
Petr Samec, 1992–1995, 9 Caps, 2 goals
Horst Siegl, 1989–1990, 23 caps, 7 goals
Jaroslav Šilhavý, 1990–1991, 4 caps

References

External links
 Official website

 
Football clubs in the Czech Republic
Association football clubs established in 1951
Association football clubs established in 2001
Czechoslovak First League clubs
Czech First League clubs
Cheb
1951 establishments in Czechoslovakia
Association football clubs disestablished in 1996